The White Plains Armory is a historic building in White Plains, New York, in Westchester County.

Located at 65 Mitchell Place/35 South Broadway, the building was built to serve as a National Guard armory. Construction of the building began in 1909 and was completed in 1910. The building was designed by architect James E. Ware. The building was 31,612 square feet and takes up three-quarters of an acre. 49th Separate Company/Company L, 10th Infantry Regiment occupied the armory from 1910 to 1939. From April 1924 to November 1929, the White Plains Armory was the temporary headquarters of Troop K of the New York State Police, after a March 3, 1924 fire destroyed the troop's headquarters at Gedney Farms. The police troop left the Armory in November 1929 after a new headquarters in Hawthorne was completed.

Subsequently, the building's tenants were the 106th Infantry Regiment and then the Headquarters and Headquarters Battalion, Company D, 212th Field Artillery.

It is located on the site of the first courthouse where the Declaration of Independence was read on July 11, 1776.

It was added to the National Register of Historic Places in 1980.

The building was vacated in 1977.  In 1982, it was converted to Armory Plaza, a senior housing complex with a senior center on first floor.

See also
 List of armories and arsenals in New York City and surrounding counties
 National Register of Historic Places listings in southern Westchester County, New York

References

Armories on the National Register of Historic Places in New York (state)
Infrastructure completed in 1910
Buildings and structures in White Plains, New York
1910 establishments in New York (state)
National Register of Historic Places in Westchester County, New York